is a Japanese actor and voice actor. He was born in Saitama.

Filmography

Film
Sennen no Koi Story of Genji (2001)

Television dramas
Tokugawa Yoshinobu (1998) (Prince Kuni Asahiko)
Aoi Tokugawa Sandai (2000) (Emperor Go-Yōzei)
Mito Kōmon (2001) (Dr. Kogorō Matsumiya)
Kōmyō ga Tsuji (2006) (Shimizu Muneharu)
AIBOU: Tokyo Detective Duo (2007)

Television animation
 Ghost in the Shell: Stand Alone Complex (2002) (Yamaguchi)
 Detective Conan (2005) (Akira Sakuma)
 Detective Conan (2006) (Korn)
 Bakugan Battle Brawlers (2007) (Exedra)
 Bokurano: Ours (2007) (Sasami)
 Detective Conan (2007) (Kakuji Dejima)
 Blassreiter (2008) (Matthew Grant)
 Bakugan Battle Brawlers: New Vestroia (2010) (Exedra)
 House of Five Leaves (2010) (Yagi Heizaemon)
 Kindaichi Case Files R (2014) (Wang Long)
 Level E (2011) (Kyushiro Yumeno)
 Robotics;Notes (2012) (Hiromu Hidaka)
 Tari Tari (2012) (Shoichi Okita)
 One Piece (2013) (Rock)
 Aldnoah.Zero (2014) (Volf Areash)
 Chaika - The Coffin Princess (2014) (Simon Scania)
 Glasslip (2014) (Ken Fukami)
 Soul Eater Not! (2014) (Cafe Master)
 Go! Princess PreCure (2015) (Tsukasa Kaido)
 Ajin: Demi-Human (2016) (Ikuya Ogura)
 Knight's & Magic (2017)
 Megalobox (2018) (Fujimaki)
 Kingdom Season 3 (2021) (Orudo)

Theatrical animation
 Utsunomiko (1989) (Kusuri)
 Jin-Roh: The Wolf Brigade (2000) (Atsushi Henmi)
 Detective Conan: The Raven Chaser (2009) (Korn)
 Ajin Part 1: Shōdō (2015) (Ikuya Ogura)

Video games
 Ace Combat Zero: The Belkan War (2006) (Joshua "LUCAN" Bristow)
 Tales of Xillia (2011) (Jilland)
 Borderlands 2 (2012, Japanese version) (Handsome Jack)
 Tales of Xillia 2 (2012) (Jilland)
 The Evil Within (2014, Japanese version) (Detective Sebastian Castellanos)
 Nioh (2017) (Edward Kelley)
 Starlink: Battle for Atlas (2019) (St. Grand)
 Fate/Grand Order (2020) (Zeus)
  Famicom Detective Club: The Missing Heir (2021 Remake) (2021) (Kanji Ayashiro)

Dubbing roles

Live-action
 Aaron Eckhart
 The Dark Knight (Harvey Dent)
 Battle: Los Angeles (Michael Nantz)
 Erased (Ben Logan)
 Sully (2020 The Cinema edition) (Jeff Skiles)
 Wander (Arthur Bretnik)
 The First Lady (Gerald Ford)
 Colin Firth
 Bridget Jones's Diary (Mark Darcy)
 Bridget Jones: The Edge of Reason (Mark Darcy)
 Nanny McPhee (Cedric Brown)
 Mamma Mia! (Harry Bright)
 Mamma Mia! Here We Go Again (Harry Bright)
 The 4400 (Jordan Collier (Billy Campbell))
 5x2 (Gilles (Stéphane Freiss))
 Ambulance (FBI Agent Anson Clark (Keir O'Donnell))
 American Beauty (2003 TBS edition) (Lester Burnham (Kevin Spacey))
 American Gods (Mr. World (Crispin Glover))
 Antarctic Journal (Lee Young-min (Park Hee-soon))
 Arbitrage (Det. Bryer (Tim Roth))
 The A-Team (Vance Burress / Agent Lynch (Patrick Wilson))
 Avalon (Murphy (Jerzy Gudejko))
 Avengers: Age of Ultron (Ultron (James Spader))
 Battle of the Sexes (Cuthbert "Ted" Tinling (Alan Cumming))
 Beethoven Virus (Kang Mae (Kim Myung-min))
 Boardwalk Empire (Roy Phillips (Ron Livingston))
 Bones (Seeley Booth (David Boreanaz))
 The Brave One (David Kirmani (Naveen Andrews))
 C.B. Strike (Andrew Fancourt (Peter Sullivan))
 Chaos (Captain Martin Jenkins (Henry Czerny))
 Charlie Countryman (Nigel (Mads Mikkelsen))
 Che (Mario Monje (Lou Diamond Phillips))
 Chicken with Plums (Nasser-Ali (Mathieu Amalric))
 Crocodile Dundee (Netflix edition) (Michael J. "Crocodile" Dundee (Paul Hogan))
 Crossbones (William Jagger (Julian Sands))
 Darkest Hour (Viscount Halifax (Stephen Dillane))
 Déjà Vu (FBI Special Agent Paul Pryzwarra (Val Kilmer))
 Devils (Dominic Morgan (Patrick Dempsey))
 Dr. Dolittle: Million Dollar Mutts (Rick Beverley (Jason Bryden))
 Draft Day (Vince Penn (Denis Leary))
 Downfall (Gruppenfuhrer Hermann Fegelein (Thomas Kretschmann))
 Eastern Promises (Nikolai Luzhin (Viggo Mortensen))
 Elizabeth: The Golden Age (Robert Reston (Rhys Ifans))
 The Expendables (Toll Road (Randy Couture))
 The Expendables 3 (Toll Road (Randy Couture))
 Feedback (Andrew Wilde (Paul Anderson))
 Firewall (Gary Mitchell (Robert Patrick))
 Ford v Ferrari (Leo Beebe (Josh Lucas))
 The Foreigner (Dunoir (Max Ryan))
 From the Earth to the Moon (Alfred Worden (Michael Raynor))
 Get Smart (2011 TV Asahi edition) (Secret Service Commander (Stephen Dunham))
 Gossip Girl (Steven Spence (Barry Watson))
 The Grand Budapest Hotel (M. Gustave (Ralph Fiennes))
 The Guilt Trip (Benjamin Graw (Brett Cullen))
 Haute Cuisine (Jean-Marc Luchet (Jean-Marc Roulot))
 Haywire (Rodrigo (Antonio Banderas))
 A History of Violence (Thomas Stall / Joseph Cusack (Viggo Mortensen))
 Hostel (Óli (Eyþór Guðjónsson))
 House (Dr. Gregory House (Hugh Laurie))
 The International (Louis Salinger (Clive Owen))
 Joe Dirt 2: Beautiful Loser (Jimmy (Mark McGrath))
 Just like Heaven (David Abbott (Mark Ruffalo))
 Kings of South Beach (Andy Burnett (Donnie Wahlberg))
 Life as We Know It (Sam (Josh Lucas))
 Life of Pi (Santosh Patel (Adil Hussain))
 The Machine (Vincent McCarthy (Toby Stephens))
 The Manchurian Candidate (Raymond Prentiss Shaw (Liev Schreiber))
 A Mighty Heart (Daniel Pearl (Dan Futterman))
 Momentum (Mr. "Washington" (James Purefoy))
 The Mule (Aaron Talbert (Billy Zane))
 Napoleon Dynamite (Uncle Rico (Jon Gries))
 The Outsider (Det. Ralph Anderson (Ben Mendelsohn))
 Pirates of the Caribbean: On Stranger Tides (The Spaniard (Óscar Jaenada))
 Possession (Ryan (Michael Landes))
 Private Practice (Pete Wilder (Tim Daly))
 Punisher: War Zone (Detective Martin Soap (Dash Mihok))
 The Ring Two (Max Rourke (Simon Baker))
 Ruby Sparks (Langdon Tharp (Steve Coogan))
 Secondhand Lions (Adult Walter Caldwell (Josh Lucas), Young Garth (Kevin Haberer))
 Sense8 (Joaquín Flores (Raúl Méndez))
 Seven Psychopaths (Hans Kieslowski (Christopher Walken))
 Shark Lake (Garreth Ross (Miles Doleac))
 Shooter (Bob Lee Swagger (Mark Wahlberg))
 Simon Birch (Ben Goodrich (Oliver Platt))
 Step Up Revolution (William "Bill" Anderson (Peter Gallagher))
 Still Alice (John Howland (Alec Baldwin))
 Submerged (Agent Fletcher (Vinnie Jones))
 Super 8 (Deputy Jackson Lamb (Kyle Chandler))
 Superman & Lois (Sam Lane (Dylan Walsh))
 The Suspect (Kim Seok-ho (Jo Sung-ha))
 Teenage Mutant Ninja Turtles (Eric Sacks (William Fichtner))
 Tomorrowland (David Nix (Hugh Laurie))
 Touch (Randall Meade (Titus Welliver))
 Tron: Legacy (Richard Mackey (Jeffrey Nordling))

Animation
 The Adventures of Tintin (Hergé)
 Batman: The Brave and the Bold (Two-Face)
 Father of the Pride (Siegfried)
 Fly Me to the Moon (Neil Armstrong)
 Incredibles 2'' (Winston Deavor)

References

External links
 En-kikaku profile
 

1958 births
Living people
Japanese male video game actors
Japanese male voice actors
Male voice actors from Saitama Prefecture